The men's pole vault at the 1998 European Athletics Championships was held at the Népstadion on 19 and 22 August.

Medalists

Results

Qualification
Qualification: Qualification Performance 5.70 (Q) or at least 12 best performers advance to the final.

Final

References

Results
Results
Results
Video

Pole Vault
Pole vault at the European Athletics Championships